Ghera may refer to:

 Ghera language, an Indo-Aryan language of Pakistan
 Glera (grape), an Italian variety of white grape
 Ghera, Himachal Pradesh, a town in Kangra district, Himachal Pradesh, India
 Ghera (drum), a drum used in the music of Madhya Pradesh, India

See also
 Gera (disambiguation)
 Gerra (disambiguation)